Tha Lo railway station is a railway station located in Tha Lo Subdistrict, Phichit City, Phichit. It is located 354.266 km from Bangkok railway station and is a class 3 railway station. It is on the Northern Line of the State Railway of Thailand. The station opened on 24 January 1908 as part of the Northern Line extension from Pak Nam Pho to Phitsanulok.

Train services
 Ordinary 201/202 Bangkok-Phitsanulok-Bangkok
 Local 401/402 Lop Buri-Phitsanulok-Lop Buri
 Local 407/408 Nakhon Sawan-Chiang Mai-Nakhon Sawan

References
 Ichirō, Kakizaki (2010). Ōkoku no tetsuro: tai tetsudō no rekishi. Kyōto: Kyōtodaigakugakujutsushuppankai. 
 Otohiro, Watanabe (2013). Tai kokutetsu yonsenkiro no tabi: shasō fūkei kanzen kiroku. Tōkyō: Bungeisha. 

Railway stations in Thailand